Rut may refer to:

Common meanings
 Rut (mammalian reproduction), the period of time when certain ruminants mate
 Rut (roads), a depression or groove worn into a road or path

Other uses
 Rut (name)
 Rut, Kardzhali Province, a village in southern Bulgaria
 Rut, Tolmin, a village in western Slovenia
 The Ruts, a reggae-influenced British punk rock band
 "Rut" (song), a 2017 song by the Killers
 The Rut, American skyrunning race
 Ticker symbol for the Russell 2000 Index
 acronym for Rho utilisation site in genetics

See also
 RUT (disambiguation)
 Rutland